Ibrahim Sesay (died 19 September 2019) was a Sierra Leonean politician. He was a member of the SLPP and member of parliament as well as deputy minister of Development and Economic Planning. He was a resident of Freetown but represented the Kambia District.

References

Year of birth missing
2019 deaths
Members of the Parliament of Sierra Leone
Sierra Leone People's Party politicians
People from Freetown
Place of birth missing
Place of death missing